The Subashi Temple is a ruined Buddhist temple near Kucha in the Taklamakan Desert, on the ancient Silk Road, in Xinjiang, Western China. The city was partly excavated by the Japanese archaeologist Count Otani.

Other famous sites nearby are the Ah-ai Grotto, Kizilgaha caves, the Kumtura Caves, the Kizil Caves and the Simsim caves. These sites and others along the Silk Road were inscribed in 2014 on the UNESCO World Heritage List as the Silk Roads: the Routes Network of Chang'an-Tianshan Corridor World Heritage Site.

A sarira, a Buddhist relic box of the 6th–7th century, discovered in Subashi shows Central Asian men in long tunics, reminiscent of friezes produced by the Tocharians.

The "Witch of Subashi" is another famous archaeological artifact, the mummy of a woman with a huge pointed hat, thought to be a representative of early Caucasian populations who lived in the region around the beginning of our era.

References

External links
The Subashi casket at the Tokyo National Museum

Buddhist temples in China
Major National Historical and Cultural Sites in Xinjiang
Sites along the Silk Road
Buddhist temples in Aksu Prefecture
Archaeological sites in China